Passaic is a city in the U.S. state of New Jersey.

Passaic may also refer to:

Places
Passaic, Missouri, a village in Bates County
Passaic County, New Jersey
Passaic River, a river in northern New Jersey
Glacial Lake Passaic, a prehistoric proglacial lake in New Jersey
Passaic Township, renamed to Long Hill Township in 1992

Stations
Passaic (NJT station), in New Jersey
Passaic station (Erie Railroad), in New Jersey
Passaic Park station (Erie Railroad), in New Jersey
Passaic Bus Terminal, in New Jersey

Ships
 USS Passaic (1862), a single turreted, coastal monitor
 USS Passaic (AN-87), a Cohoes-class net laying ship
 USS Pontiac (YT-20) or USS Passaic (YT-20), a harbor tugboat